Jordi García Pinto (born 14 February 1990) is a Spanish professional golfer.

García Pinto was born in Girona, Spain. He turned professional in 2008.

García Pinto played on the Challenge Tour in 2012, finishing 53rd on the money list. He won the second event of the 2013 season, the Barclays Kenya Open. He uses his full name to distinguish himself from fellow Spanish golfer Jordi García del Moral.

Professional wins (2)

Challenge Tour wins (2)

See also
2014 Challenge Tour graduates

References

External links

Spanish male golfers
Golfers from Catalonia
European Tour golfers
Sportspeople from Girona
1990 births
Living people
20th-century Spanish people
21st-century Spanish people